Frank Parkinson Newbould (24 September 1887 – 24 December 1951) was an English poster artist, known for his travel posters and Second World War posters for the War Office as assistant to Abram Games.

Early life
He was born in Bradford, to John Newbould (1856–1944), chemist, from Pateley Bridge, and Sara Ellen, née Robinson (1856–1941), also from Bradford. He was their only child. He was educated at Bradford College of Art and Camberwell School of Art.

Career

He worked mostly in London from the interwar period specialising in travel posters. His clients included the Empire Marketing Board; London Transport and its predecessors; the London & North Eastern, Great Western and London, Midland and Scottish Railways, and the Orient and Cunard Lines.

In 1942 he joined the War Office as assistant to Abram Games, where he produced eleven posters, including a series Your Britain, Fight for it Now.

His work was characterised by bold shapes and colours.

Personal life
In 1919, Newbould married Marion Jane Thomson. He died in London on 24 December 1951.

Further reading
 
 Howell, Brian. 1980. The poster and its development between 1870 and 1945, concentrating on Frank Newbould (1887–1951). Bath: Bath Academy of Art.
 Rennie, Paul.  2014. 'Newbould, Frank Parkinson (1887–1951)’, Oxford Dictionary of National Biography, Oxford University Press, Accessed Nov 2017

References

External links
 Science & Society Picture Library
 London Transport Museum
 www.ww2poster.co.uk
 notjusthockney

1887 births
1951 deaths
20th-century English artists
Alumni of Camberwell College of Arts
Artists from Bradford
British poster artists
English graphic designers
War Office personnel in World War II
World War II artists